The structure of the Egyptian Air Force, sourced from scramble.nl, is described below.

By June 1940 at the beginning of the Western Desert Campaign, the Royal Egyptian Air Force comprised: 	
1 Squadron (Egypt) with Westland Lysander Mk. II
2 Squadron (Egypt) with Gloster Gladiator Mk. II
3 Squadron (Egypt) and 4 Squadron (Egypt) with Avro 626s and Avro 674s respectively
5 Squadron (Egypt) with Gloster Gladiator Mk. II

Air Bases 
Source:

Abu Suweir Air Base 
El Mansoura Air Base 
Borg al Arab Air Base  
Aswan Air Base 
Az Zagazig (Abu Hammad) Air Base  
Beni Sueif Air Base 
Bilbeis Air Base  
Birma/Tanta Air Base  
Almaza Air Base  
Cairo/Intl Air Base  
Cairo-West Air Base 
El Minya Air Base  
Fayid Air Base  
Gebel El Basur Air Base  
Hurghada Air Base  
Inshas Air Base  
Gianaclis New Air Base 
Kom Awshim Air Base 
Mersa Matruh Air Base  
Wadi El Gandali (Khatamia) Air Base

Order of battle 
Data from

102 Tactical Fighter Wing (Mersa Matruh)
25 Squadron - Inshas (EMB-312 Tucano)
26 Squadron – Ismaïlia (+Milaz) (AT-802 Air Tractor)
35 Squadron - Hurghada (EMB-312 Tucano)
104 Tactical Fighter Wing
42 TFS - Wadi Abu Rish (MiG-29M2)
44 TFS - Wadi Abu Rish (MiG-29M2)
 Aviation Training Center (MiG-29M2)252 Tactical Fighter Wing' (Gebel el Basur)
82 Squadron - Gebel el Basur (Mirage 2000)282 Tactical Fighter Wing (Fayid)
86th TFS – Fayid (F-16C/D)
88th TFS – Fayid (F-16C/D)601 Air Wing (Cairo West Air Base)
87 Squadron – Cairo/West (E-2C)292 Tactical Fighter Wing95 TFS – Cairo West Air Base (F-16C/D B52)
97 TFS – Cairo West Air Base (F-16C/D B52)
.. 601 ECM Brigade80sq – Kom Awshim (Teledyne UAV)53? Helicopter Brigade18sq – Kom Awshim (CH-47C)272 Tactical Fighter Wing75th TFS – Gianaclis (F-16C/D) 
77th TFS – Gianaclis (F-16C/D) 
79th TFS – Gianaclis (F-16C/D) 232 Tact Fighter Wing72nd TFS – Mersa Matruh (F-16A/B)
74th TFS – Mersa Matruh (F-16A/B)Navigation School2sq – Inshas (An-74)544 ECM Brigade81sq – Inshas (Beech 1900)252 Tactical Fighter Wing71sq – Gebel El Basur (Mir.5SDE)
82sq – Gebel El Basur (Mir.2000)203 Tactical Fighter Wing34sq – Gebel El Basur (Rafale)242 Tact Fighter Wing68th TFS – Aswan (F-16C/D)
70th TFS – Beni Sueif (F-16C/D)
23sq – Beni Sueif (Mi-17)262 Tact Fighter Wing60th TFS – Abu Suweir (F-16C/D)308th Tactical Fighter Wing56 TFS – El Mansourah (Alpha Jet)
57 TFS – El Mansourah (Alpha Jet)544 Air Wing40sq -Almaza (UH-60)
8sq – Almaza (Mi-8)
9sq – Almaza (Mi-8)533 Helicopter Brigade5sq – Almaza (Commando)
6sq – Almaza (Commando)548 Helicopter Brigade10 Squadron – Abu Sultan (SA-342)
15 Squadron – Abu Sultan (SA-342)
17 Squadron – Abu Sultan (SA-342)5?? Helicopter Brigade..sq – Quweisna (Mi-17) GovernmentGovernment Flight – Cairo/AlmazaFlying Training Air Squadron101 Air Brigade3 Squadron – Bilbeis (Grob 115EG)
5 Squadron – Bilbeis (Grob 115EG)550 Attack Heli Brigade51sq – Wadi el Jandali (AH-64)
52sq – Az Zagaziq (AH-64)
53sq – Az Zaqaziq (AH-64)516 Transport Brigade4sq – Cairo/Intl (C-130H)
16sq – Cairo/Intl (C-130H)533 Air Wing2 Squadron - Cairo East (C-295M/An-74T-200)
8 Squadron – Cairo East (C-295)Air Force Academy – Training Brigade..sq – Bilbeis (K-8E)
..sq – Bilbeis (K-8E)
..sq – Bilbeis (K-8E)Air Force Academy – Training Brigade83sq – Bilbays (EMB-312)
84sq – Bilbays (EMB-312)
85sq – Bilbays (EMB-312)Air Navigation School..sq – Bilbays
 2sq – Almaza (DHC-2)770th Weapon Training Brigade89sq – El Minya (L-59)
98sq – El Minya (K-8E)
201sq – El Minya (K-8E)312 Helicopter Training Brigade..sq – Daraw (Mi-8)545th Tactical Helicopter Wing7sq – Borg al Arab (Sea King)
11sq – Borg al Arab (SA-342)
37sq – Borg al Arab (SH-2G)

 Silver Stars Aerobatic Team Silver Stars''' is the Egyptian Air Force aerobatic display team flying 10 K-8E Karakorum jet trainer aircraft painted in white, red and black colors. All planes are equipped with red, white and black smoke generators. During the shows, the Silver Stars performs eight different formations along with several single aircraft passes. Aircraft #6325 (Star 1) carries the name "Sharaf" after the team leader. Another team's planes also carried the pilots names painted at the K-8 nose. All pilots are flying instructors at the Egyptian Air force Academy based in Belbeis Airport.

The Egyptian Air Force demonstration team "The Silver Stars" was formed in mid 1974 to participate in the "October War" anniversary. Pilots of the team were flying instructors at the Air force College and flew four L-29 planes painted in dark green and brown and yellow – standard color scheme. In 1984, the Silver Stars aerobatic team switched to six Alpha Jet training airplanes. In the following year, team's planes became nine.
In 2003, the team made the switch to the K-8E Karakorum trainer and from 2005 was led by Group Captain Mostafa Fathi.
Since 2010, the team is now flying ten aircraft – nine plus one solo.

References 

Egyptian Air Force
Structure of contemporary air forces